"Pyramid" is the second single by Filipino pop and R&B singer Jake Zyrus, credited under his pre-gender transition name Charice. The song features vocals from British Virgin Islands singer Iyaz, was written by David Jassy, Niclas Molinder, Joacim Persson, Johan Alkenäs and R&B singer-songwriter Lyrica Anderson, and produced by Twin and Alke.

"Pyramid" is a midtempo pop ballad with lyrics that metaphorically describes the strength of a relationship. "Pyramid" peaked at number 56 on the US Billboard Hot 100, making Zyrus the second Filipino singer to enter the chart since Jaya's debut single "If You Leave Me Now" peaked on the Billboard Hot 100 at number 44 in 1990. It reached number one on the Billboard Dance Club Songs chart.

Pyramid was the lead single from Zyrus' debut album, Charice. A remix of the song was to be released on iTunes on February 16, 2010, but was later changed to February 23, the same day as the release of the album version. The album version was itself then delayed and released on March 2. "Pyramid" had already received airplay before it was released to iTunes. It aired on 104.3 in Las Vegas before its release as a single. The album version was released to US mainstream radio on March 15, 2010. It is his first single to achieve mainstream airplay. The song was sung in Simlish for The Sims 3: Ambitions, an expansion pack for the strategic life simulation computer game, The Sims 3.

Live performances

Zyrus's first live performance was on The Oprah Winfrey Show with Iyaz on May 11, 2010. He also performed it on QVC with his other songs from his self-titled album, Charice such as "I Love You", "Note to God" and "In This Song".

Music video
The promotional music video for the track was released on March 2, 2010. The video shows Zyrus and Iyaz in the studio singing and recording the vocals to the song.

The official music video for the track was directed by Scott Speer and released on April 12, 2010, premiering on Oprah Winfrey's website. The video was shot at the Orpheum Theatre, in downtown Los Angeles on March 8, 2010. The music video shows Zyrus upset at not being selected for further school auditions. Zyrus steps out on stage and Iyaz films his singing on his camera phone.

Track listing

Digital download
 "Pyramid" (featuring Iyaz) (album version) – 4:07

UK CDR promo
 "Pyramid" (feat. Iyaz)
 "Pyramid" (Instrumental)

Remix EP – digital download
 "Pyramid" (Barry Harris Club)
 "Pyramid" (Barry Harris Radio Edit)
 "Pyramid" (Jonathan Peters Club)
 "Pyramid" (Jonathan Peters Radio Edit)
 "Pyramid" (Dave Audé Club)
 "Pyramid" (Dave Audé Radio Edit)

iTunes Canada single version
"Pyramid" – 3:21

Europe digital – EP
 "Pyramid" (featuring Iyaz) – 3:56
 "Pyramid" (Dave Audé Club) – 7:04
 "Pyramid" (Dave Audé Radio Edit) – 3:59
 "Pyramid" (Jonathan Peters Radio Edit) – 3:43

Charts and certifications

Weekly charts

Year-end charts

Certifications

Release history

See also
 List of number-one dance singles of 2010 (U.S.)

References

External links
 143/Reprise
 charicemusic.com

2010 singles
2010 songs
Contemporary R&B ballads
Iyaz songs
Jake Zyrus songs
Music videos directed by Scott Speer
Pop ballads
Reprise Records singles
Song recordings produced by Twin (production team)
Songs written by David Jassy
Songs written by Joacim Persson
Songs written by Johan Alkenäs
Songs written by Lyrica Anderson
Songs written by Niclas Molinder
143 Records singles
Warner Records singles